Ivanovskaya is a rural locality (a village) in Sibirskoye Rural Settlement, Verkhovazhsky District, Vologda Oblast, Russia. The population was 22 as of 2002.

Geography 
The distance to Verkhovazhye is 49.5 km, to Yeliseyevskaya is 0.5 km. Biryuchevskaya, Gniluzhskaya, Boyarskaya, and Yeliseyevskaya are the nearest rural localities.

References 

Rural localities in Verkhovazhsky District